La Grange, also known as Samuel Henry Black House, is a historic home located near Glasgow, New Castle County, Delaware. It was built in 1815, and is a two-story, five bay, Federal style manor house. The front facade features a pedimented entrance portico.  Attached to the house are two dependencies.  The western wing is a former smokehouse and the eastern wing is a kitchen.

It was added to the National Register of Historic Places in 1974.

References

Houses on the National Register of Historic Places in Delaware
Federal architecture in Delaware
Houses completed in 1815
Houses in New Castle County, Delaware
National Register of Historic Places in New Castle County, Delaware